Dacrila is a genus of beetle belonging to the family Staphylinidae.

The genus was first described by Mulsant and Rey in 1874.

The species of this genus are found in Europe.

Species:
 Dacrila fallax (Kraatz, 1856)

References

Staphylinidae
Staphylinidae genera